The 2011–12 UCI Track Cycling World Cup (also known as the 2011–2012 UCI Track Cycling World Cup, presented by Samsung for sponsorship reasons) was a multi-race tournament over a season of track cycling. The season ran from 4 November 2011 to 19 February 2012. The World Cup is organised by the Union Cycliste Internationale.  In this edition the World Cup consisted of four rounds in Astana, Cali, Beijing and London.

The series played a key role in who qualified for the 2012 Summer Olympics and had its final round staged in the Veldorome where the 2012 Olympics were later held in London, as well as having a round in the 2008 Summer Olympics Velodrome in Beijing.

Series
The 2011–12 Track Cycling World Cup took place over four rounds, in Astana, Cali, Beijing and London.

Astana
Astana in Kazakhstan was the host city for the first round of the 2011–12 UCI Track Cycling World Cup, which took place between 4 and 6 November 2011. It is the second largest city in the country and held the 2011 Asian Winter Games. The competition took place at the Saryarka Velodrome.

Cali

Beijing

London

The fourth round took place in London between 17 and 19 February 2012, and formed part of the 'London Prepares' series of test events for the 2012 Olympics. It was the first event to take place in the Olympic velodrome.

All three medal winning teams in the women's team pursuit went under the previous world record time of 3:19.569, held by the USA. Great Britain's Dani King, Joanna Rowsell and Laura Trott set a new world record of 3:18.148.

The Australian pairing of Anna Meares and Kaarle McCulloch broke the women's team sprint world record in the qualifying round, setting a new time of 32.828. The previous time of 32.923 was also set by Australia two years previously. But, they failed to repeat the performance in the final, losing to Great Britain's Jess Varnish and Victoria Pendleton who raised the bar to set a new world record of 32.754.

Overall team standings
Overall team standings are calculated based on total number of points gained by the team's riders in each event. The top ten teams after round 4 are listed below:

Results

Men

Women

References

External links

Astana World Cup website
Schedule of the Astana World Cup
Schedule of the Cali World Cup

 
World Cup Classics
World Cup Classics
UCI Track Cycling World Cup
UCI Track Cycling World Cup Classics
2011 in Kazakhstani sport
2011 in Colombian sport
2012 in Chinese sport